Marak is an unincorporated community in Milam County, Texas located on Farm Road 2269 near Cameron.

It was founded in the 1880s and was named after František Marak, a Moravian Czech immigrant who moved to the area.

References

Milam County, Texas